Rod is a common diminutive (hypocorism) of various masculine given names, including Rodney, Roderick, Rodford and Rodion. 

It may refer to:

 Rod Allen (born 1959), American baseball player and commentator 
 Rod Allen (advertising executive) (1929–2007), nicknamed the "jingle king"
 Rod Bernard (1940–2020), American singer
 Rod Blagojevich (born 1956), American politician
 Rod Bonella (1937–2000), Australian long-distance runner and horse trainer
 Rod Brind'Amour (born 1970), Canadian ice hockey player
 Rod Brown (born 1978), American basketball player
 Rod Brown (gridiron football) (born 1963), American former football player
 Rod Cameron (actor) (1910–1983), Canadian film and television actor born Nathan Roderick Cox
 Rod Cameron (footballer) (born 1939), English former footballer
 Rod Daniel (born 1942), American film director
 Rod Davies (1930–2015), British astronomer
 Rod Davis (gridiron football) (born 1981), American National Football League and Canadian Football League linebacker
 Rod Davis (sailor) (born 1955), American-born Olympic sailor who competed for the United States and New Zealand
 Rod Davis (Quarrymen), member of the British skiffle and rock 'n' roll group The Quarrymen
 Rod Dyachenko (born 1983), Russian association football player 
 Rod Fergusson (born 1968), Canadian video game producer
 Rod Foster (born 1960), American basketball player
 Rod Gilbert (1941–2021), Canadian-American ice hockey player
 Rod Hardy, Australian television and film director
 Rod Hay (born 1947), English-born filmmaker
 Rod Johnson (footballer) (born 1945), English retired football player
 Rod Johnson (programmer), founder of the Spring Framework, an open source application framework for Java
 Rod Jones (disambiguation), multiple people
 Rod Macqueen (born 1949), Australian former rugby union coach
 Rod Mandelstam (born 1942), South African tennis player
 Rod Manuel (born 1974), American football player
 Rod McKuen (1933–2015), American singer-songwriter, composer and poet
 Rod Robinson (born 1976), American football player
 Rod Roddenberry (born 1974), American television producer and writer
 Rod Roddy (1937–2003), American radio and television announcer
 Rod Serling (1924–1975), American screenwriter, playwright, television producer, host and narrator
 Rod Smallwood (disambiguation), multiple people
 Rod Smith (disambiguation), multiple people
 Rod Steiger (1925–2002), American actor
 Rod Stewart (born 1945), British rock musician
 Rod Thorn (born 1941), American basketball player, coach, and executive 
 Rod Tolbert (born 1967), American former sprinter
 Rod Wave (born 1999), American rapper

See also 

 Roddy

Hypocorisms